Berith Agneta Eriksson (born 3 May 1965 in Västerås, Västmanland) is a Swedish former freestyle swimmer. Aged fifteen she won a silver medal in 4 × 100 m freestyle relay at the 1980 Summer Olympics in Moscow along with Carina Ljungdahl, Tina Gustafsson and Agneta Mårtensson. She also competed in the 1984 and 1988 Summer Olympics.

Personal bests

Long course (50 m)

Clubs
 Västerås SS

References
 

1965 births
Living people
Olympic swimmers of Sweden
Swimmers at the 1980 Summer Olympics
Swimmers at the 1984 Summer Olympics
Swimmers at the 1988 Summer Olympics
Olympic silver medalists for Sweden
Swedish female freestyle swimmers
European Aquatics Championships medalists in swimming
Västerås SS swimmers
Medalists at the 1980 Summer Olympics
Olympic silver medalists in swimming
Sportspeople from Västerås
20th-century Swedish women
21st-century Swedish women